Shamata Anchan  is an Indian television actress and a model.

Early life 
Shamata Anchan is from a Tulu-speaking Billava (Poojary) family that hails from Mangalore, Karnataka.

Career

Modelling 
She is the winner of Pantaloons Femina Miss India South 2012 pageant. She was also one of the finalists of Pantaloons Femina Miss India 2012. She has done many advertisements for famous brands and has done modelling and print campaigns for many fashion designers, and cosmetics brands like Santoor. She was also a part of Chal Kar Pehel, an initiative launched by Star Plus.

Television 

Shamata Anchan debuted on television with the show Everest, produced by filmmaker Ashutosh Gowarikar. She played the role of Anjali Singh Rawat, the main lead in the show along with Rohan Gandotra and Sahil Salathia. The show aired on Star Plus channel. She was also the female lead of the serial Bin Kuch Kahe, which aired on Zee Tv.

Films 

Shamata has done an extended cameo in the Hollywood movie, Heartbeats. Shamata is making her Bollywood debut with upcoming movie The Field in 2019 alongside Abhay Deol. She debuted as a sub-inspector of Mumbai police alongside Rajinikanth starrer Darbar in 2020.

Acting credits

Television 

2014 Everest as Anjali Singh Rawat
2017 Bin Kuch Kahe as Myra Kohli

Films 
2020 Darbar as Police Officer

References

External links

Living people
Year of birth missing (living people)
Tulu people
Female models from Karnataka
Indian television actresses
Actresses from Mangalore
Actresses in Hindi television
Actresses in Hindi cinema